Eugene Walter Leake (July 13, 1877 in Jersey City, New Jersey – August 23, 1959 in New York City) was an American Democratic Party politician from New Jersey who represented the 9th congressional district for one term from 1907 to 1909.

Early life and education
Leake was born in Jersey City, New Jersey on July 13, 1877. He attended the public schools and Phillips Academy, Andover, Massachusetts, and graduated from New York Law School in 1898. He was admitted to the New Jersey bar in 1898 and commenced practice in Jersey City. In 1908, he was admitted to the New York bar and practiced in New York City.

Congress
Leake was elected as a Democrat to the Sixtieth Congress, serving in office from March 4, 1907 – March 3, 1909, but was not a candidate for renomination in 1908.

Later life
After leaving Congress, he was general counsel for the Adams Express Co. from 1927-1932. In 1931, he was elected chairman of the board of directors of the American Railway Express Co., and was a director of Loew's, Inc.

Death
He died in New York City on August 23, 1959, and was interred in Cedar Lawn Cemetery in Paterson, New Jersey.

Leake and his wife Marion (Paige) Leake were the parents of two sons, one of whom, Eugene Leake, was a notable artist and museum curator.

References

External links

Eugene Walter Leake at The Political Graveyard

1877 births
1959 deaths
Politicians from Jersey City, New Jersey
Democratic Party members of the United States House of Representatives from New Jersey
Phillips Academy alumni
New York Law School alumni
Burials at Cedar Lawn Cemetery